Peter Andre is the self-titled debut album from Australian singer-songwriter Peter Andre.

Background
In 1990, Andre became famous when he took part in the Australian television talent show New Faces. Following Andre's success in the program, Melodian Records offered him a £1 million pound record deal. In 1992, Andre released his debut single, "Drive Me Crazy", which peaked at #72 on the Australian singles chart. However, Andre's musical breakthrough occurred with his second single, "Gimme Little Sign", which peaked at #3 in Australia and spent 35 weeks in the top 100. Andre's self-titled debut album was released in November 1993, peaking at #27 on the Australian albums chart. Three further singles were released from the album: "Funky Junky", which was regularly used as background music in soap opera Neighbours, the double A-side "Let's Get It On / Do You Wanna Dance?" and "To the Top", all of which peaked within the Australian Top 50. In 1993, "Gimme Little Sign" received an ARIA Award for the highest selling single of the year recorded by an Australian artist. Originally, the album was only made available for sale in Australia; however, following Andre's successful Japanese breakthrough, the album was later issued in the country with new cover artwork on 5 January 1994. Both copies of the album share an identical track listing. Following Andre's international breakthrough, "To the Top" later appeared on the British release of his second studio album, Natural.

Track listing

Charts

Certifications

References

1993 debut albums
ARIA Award-winning albums
Peter Andre albums